The 1958 Eastern Michigan Hurons football team represented Eastern Michigan College (renamed Eastern Michigan University in 1959) in the Interstate Intercollegiate Athletic Conference (IIAC) during the 1958 NCAA College Division football season. In their seventh season under head coach Fred Trosko, the Hurons compiled a 4–5 record (3–3 against IIAC opponents) and outscored their opponents, 108 to 88.  Charles J. Shonta was the team captain The team's statistical leaders included John Kubiak with 452 passing yards and 410 yards of total offense, Albert Day with 296 rushing yards, and Jerry Wedge with 183 receiving yards. On October 18, 1958, the Hurons defeated Eastern Illinois, 31–0, in front for a homecoming crowd of 7,200 at Briggs Field in Ypsilanti. Alex Klukach received the team's most valuable player award.

Schedule

References

Eastern Michigan
Eastern Michigan Eagles football seasons
Eastern Michigan Hurons football